is a Japanese actor.

Career
Yanagiba has appeared in films such as the Bayside Shakedown series, Chinese Dinner, and Space Battleship Yamato.

Filmography

Film
 Run Towards the South On the Road of Sea (1986) 
 Young Girls in Love (1986)
 Hachiko Monogatari (1987)
 Hope and Pain (1988)
 Only Yesterday (1991)
 Bayside Shakedown: The Movie (1998), Shinji Muroi
 Senrigan (2000)
 Chinese Dinner (2001)
 Bayside Shakedown 2 (2003), Shinji Muroi
 Year One in the North (2005)
 Lorelei: The Witch of the Pacific Ocean (2005)
 Negotiator (2005), Shinji Muroi
 The Suspect (2005), Shinji Muroi
 Oh! Oku (2006)
 Nobody to Watch Over Me (2008)
 Bayside Shakedown 3 (2010), Shinji Muroi
 Space Battleship Yamato (2010), Shirō Sanada
 Isoroku (2011), Shigeyoshi Inoue
 Bayside Shakedown The Final (2012), Shinji Muroi
 Reunion (2012)
 Kōfuku no Alibi (2012)
 Any Crybabies Around? (2020)
 Hikari wo Oikakete (2021)
 A Morning of Farewell (2021)
 The Three Sisters of Tenmasou Inn (2022)
 Baian the Assassin, M.D. (2023)
 Shylock's Children (2023), Kaoru Kujō

Television
 Taiheiki (1991), Ishi
 Bayside Shakedown (1997), Shinji Muroi
 Hōjō Tokimune (2001), Adachi Yasumori
 The Family (2007), Shoichi Mikumo
 Fumō Chitai (2009), Isao Kawamata
 Shiroi Kyotō (2019)
 Boogie Woogie (2023), Umekichi Hanada

References

External links
 Official website 
 

Japanese male actors
1961 births
Living people
People from Daisen, Akita
Actors from Akita Prefecture
Japanese racehorse owners and breeders